Kwak Hyun-hwa (born March 2, 1981) is a South Korean actress, comedian, model and singer.

Early life 
Kwak Hyun-hwa was born on 2 March 1981 in Busan, South Korea. She graduated from Ewha Womans University with a bachelor's degree in Mathematics.

Career 
In 2011, Kwak appeared in UV's "Tralala" music video on November 19.

In 2012, she appeared in the movie House With a Good View as Mi-yeon.

In 2013, Kwak was cast in the movie Playboy Bong as herself.

Filmography

Television series

Films

Discography 
 Psycho (June 28, 2010)

Bibliography
 Goddess of Mathematics (Published on 6 February 2011)

See also 
 List of Korean given names
 Kwak (Korean surname)

References

External links 

1981 births
Living people
People from Busan
South Korean female models
South Korean television actresses
South Korean film actresses
Ewha Womans University alumni
21st-century South Korean singers
21st-century South Korean women singers